The Prince William Parkway is a road in Prince William County, Virginia. The road carries two designations.  Starting in the east at the intersection with U.S. Route 1 (US 1) in Woodbridge to the west until intersecting with Dumfries Road (Virginia State Route 234 or SR 234) south of Manassas, it carries State Route 294 (formerly SR 3000). At Dumfries Road, the Prince William Parkway assumes the SR 234 designation until ending at Interstate 66 (I-66) near Gainesville.

History 

SR 294 from I-95 to Dumfries Road was built by Prince William County in the mid-1990s. The SR 234 portion from Dumfries Road to I-66 was built by the Virginia Department of Transportation (VDOT) in late–1990s as a bypass of the old SR 234 through Manassas. The existing portion of SR 234 was renamed SR 234 Business. The last portion of the Prince William Parkway, an extension of SR 294 from I-95 to US 1, was built by Prince William County in 2005. On February 16, 2012, the former route designation for the Prince William Parkway, SR 3000, was changed to SR 294 by VDOT when the Commonwealth Transportation Board approved the transfer of the secondary road to a primary road for better maintenance of the parkway. Signage has been updated to reflect the new numbering along with "old SR 3000" signs.

Honorary names 

The SR 294 portion from I-95 to its intersection with Liberia Avenue and SR 663 (Wellington Road) has been designated the Kathleen K. Seefeldt Parkway for Kathleen Seefeldt, the former Chairman of the Prince William Board of County Supervisors.  The SR 234 portion from Dumfries Road to I-66 has been designated the Ronald Wilson Reagan Highway for Ronald Reagan.

Future

SR 234 and Balls Ford Road interchange 
As a part of the Transform 66 project, the current at-grade intersection of SR 234 and Balls Ford Road will be converted to a diverging diamond interchange at a cost of $167 million. In addition, Balls Ford Road would be widened from a two lanes street to a four-lane divided roadway between its intersection at Devlin Road / Wellington Road through the interchange to Doane Drive. This project coincides with a separate project to widen Balls Ford Road between Doane Drive to Ashton Avenue. Construction is expected to begin in Fall 2020 and be completed in late 2022.

SR 234 and University Boulevard intersection 
A quadrant roadway intersection is planned at the intersection of SR 234 and University Boulevard in Manassas. Construction is expected to start in Fall 2020 and be completed in Fall 2022.

Major intersections

References

External links 

 Prince William Parkway, from The Roads of Northern Virginia

294
Prince William Parkway